Mâle is a former commune in the Orne department in north-western France. On 1 January 2016, it was merged into the new commune of Val-au-Perche.

See also
Communes of the Orne department

References

Former communes of Orne